Maria Nazareth Cascante Madrigal (born October 20, 1990) is a Costa Rican model and beauty pageant titleholder who was crowned Miss Costa Rica 2012 and was represented her country in the Miss Universe 2012. Nazareth was also crowned as Miss Teen International in 2009.

Early life
Nazareth is a student of Pharmaceutical Science from El Tambor of Alajuela.

Miss Costa Rica 2012
Nazareth Cascante has been crowned Miss Costa Rica 2012 on Saturday night 14 April 2012 at the Teletica studios in San Jose. Nazareth Cascante is an official representative of Costa Rica in Miss Universe 2012 which is the 61st edition of Miss Universe beauty contest. As a part of winner prize, Nazareth Cascante have won a new wardrobe and jewelry set, a new car and about $7,000 in cash.

References

External links
 Miss Costa Rica official website

1990 births
Living people
People from Alajuela
Miss Universe 2012 contestants
Costa Rican beauty pageant winners